Artemio Precioso Ugarte (1917 - August 15, 2007) was a Spanish economist and environmentalist.

He founded the Socio-ecological Research Center to educate young scholars in environmental economics. He co-founded Greenpeace Spain and was its honorary president from 2004.

Legacy 
Greenpeace Spain presents an annual award in his name.

References

Greenpeace

Spanish economists
2007 deaths
1917 births